Federal elections were held in Switzerland on 26 October 1947. Although the Social Democratic Party received the most votes, the Free Democratic Party emerged as the largest party in the National Council, winning 52 of the 194 seats.

Results

National Council

By constituency

Council of the States
In several cantons the members of the Council of the States were chosen by the cantonal parliaments.

References

Switzerland
1947 in Switzerland
Federal elections in Switzerland
October 1947 events in Europe
Federal